Moses the Lawgiver (1975) is a novel by Australian writer Thomas Keneally. The novel is based on the British television series "Moses the Lawgiver", for which Anthony Burgess wrote the script.

Story outline
The novel follows the story of the biblical figure Moses who found the Ten Commandments and parted the Red Sea.

Critical reception
In her review of the book in The Australian Women's Weekly Nicola Worsley concluded: "I will admit to being beguiled by the whole publication. Thomas Keneally, with a novelist's imagination and insight, has taken familiar and unfamiliar aspects of Moses' life to bring to interesting reality this dramatic tale."

See also
 1975 in Australian literature
 Moses the Lawgiver - 6-hour British television miniseries transmitted in 1973 and 1974

References

Novels by Thomas Keneally
1975 novels